The 2015 FIG World Cup circuit in Rhythmic Gymnastics includes seven category B events. Except for Bucharest, which is a competition for individuals only, all tournaments feature Individual and Group competitions. The All-around medal event also serves as qualification for the apparatus finals.

With six stopovers in Europe and one in Asia, the competitions took place on March 26–29 in Lisbon (POR), April 3–5 in Bucharest (ROU), April 10 – 12 in Pesaro (ITA), May 22 – 24 in Tashkent (UZB), August 7 – 9 in Budapest (HUN), August 14–16 in Sofia (BUL), and August 21–23 in Kazan (RUS).

The world ranking points collected by the competitors at their best four World Cup events added up to a total, and the top scorers in each discipline were crowned winners of the overall series at the final event in Kazan, Russia.

Formats

Medal winners

All-around

Individual

Group all-around

Apparatus

Hoop

Ball

Clubs

Ribbon

5 Ribbons

2 Hoops and 6 Clubs

Overall medal table

See also
 2015 FIG Artistic Gymnastics World Cup series

References

Rhythmic Gymnastics World Cup
2015 in gymnastics